Gerolamo Vecciani (died 1550) was a Roman Catholic prelate who served as Bishop of Vulturara e Montecorvino (1542–1550).

Biography
On 18 Aug 1542, Gerolamo Vecciani was appointed during the papacy of Pope Paul III as Bishop of Vulturara e Montecorvino. He served as Bishop of Vulturara e Montecorvino until his death in 1550. While bishop, he was the principal co-consecrator of Girolamo Gaddi, Bishop of Cortona (1563).

References

External links and additional sources 
 (for Chronology of Bishops) 
 (for Chronology of Bishops) 

16th-century Italian Roman Catholic bishops
1550 deaths
Bishops appointed by Pope Paul III